George of Cambridge may refer to:

Prince George, Duke of Cambridge (1819–1904), born Prince George of Cambridge, a grandson of George III through his son Prince Adolphus, Duke of Cambridge
George Cambridge, 2nd Marquess of Cambridge (1895–1981), great-great-grandson of King George III and nephew of Queen Mary
Prince George of Wales (born 2013), grandson of Charles III and the son of William, Prince of Wales was called "Prince George of Cambridge" before his grandfather acceded